Natale "Joe Diamond" Evola (February 22, 1907 – August 28, 1973) was a New York mobster who briefly became boss of the Bonanno crime family who was succeeded by Philip Rastelli, and preceded Paul Sciacca as boss in 1971.

Natale Evola was born in the Bay Ridge section of Brooklyn to parents Filippo and Francesca Evola, natives of Castellammare del Golfo, Sicily. Natale Evola had two brothers (Paul and Joseph Evola) and three sisters (Anna Evola, Josephine DiBarloto, and Mamie Grazzo). Natale Evola never married and lived with his mother in Bay Ridge.

Evola's arrest record would eventually include coercion, possession of gun, and federal narcotic law violations. Evola was heavily involved in narcotics trafficking and in labor racketeering in the Garment District of Manhattan.

Evola was a close associate of Joseph Bonanno, the original boss of the Bonanno crime family. In 1931, Evola served as an usher at Bonanno's wedding.

In 1957, Evola was identified at the infamous Apalachin Meeting in Apalachin, New York and later charged, along with twenty other organized figures, with conspiracy. The case was later overturned.

On April 17, 1959, Evola was sentenced to 10 years in federal prison after being convicted on conspiracy to distribute narcotics. Evola had helped manage a large organization that imported heroin from Sicily to the United States.  Following family boss Joe Bonanno's retirement in 1968, Evola reportedly became the boss of the family. Heavily involved in the trucking industry in the Garment District, Evola cooperated with crime family leaders Genovese and Carlo Gambino of the Gambino crime family.

On August 28, 1973, Natale Evola died of cancer at Columbus Hospital in the Bronx.  He is buried in Calvary Cemetery in the Woodside, Queens section of New York.

References

External links
 The American "Mafia" - Natale Evola
 Attendee Profiles At The 1957 Apalachin Mob Confab By Mike La Sorte

 

1907 births
1973 deaths
American gangsters of Italian descent
People from Bay Ridge, Brooklyn
Bosses of the Bonanno crime family
Deaths from cancer in New York (state)